The 2010–11 season was Bristol Rovers fourth season in League One since being promoted via the League Two play-offs in 2006–07. Bristol Rovers had a poor season and on 30 April 2011, they were relegated to League Two after a 1–1 draw with Sheffield Wednesday. Bristol Rovers 2010–11 season officially began on 1 July 2010 and concluded on 30 June 2011, with competitive fixtures taking place between August and May.

Season Events

  – Bristol Rovers manager Paul Trollope is sacked by Bristol Rovers after 5 seasons in charge of the club.
  – Bristol Rovers appoint Dave Penney as their new manager.
  – Bristol Rovers sack manager Dave Penney and leaves the club languishing 23rd in the League One table, five points from safety.
  – Bristol Rovers sign 20-year-old Bermudan international Reggie Lambe on loan from Ipswich Town until the end of the season.
  – On 30 April 2011, Bristol Rovers were relegated to League Two after a 2–1 defeat away at Colchester United.

Competitions

Overall

Football League One

Standings

Pld = Matches played; W = Matches won; D = Matches drawn; L = Matches lost; F = Goals for; A = Goals against; GD = Goal difference; Pts = Points; (R) = Relegated

Results summary

Result round by round

Penalties awarded

Season statistics

Appearances, goals and cards

As of 9 May 2011.

Goalscorers

Awards

Club awards
At the end of the season, Bristol Rovers held annual awards dinner. Rewards received were for the players and backroom staff, for instance such as Player of the Year, Young Player of the Year, Youth Player of the Year, Goal of the Season and Clubman of the Year. The event was held at The Memorial Stadium, the supporters and the supporters club were all in attendance.

Transfers

In

Out

Fixtures and results

Pre-season friendlies

League One

September

October

November

December

January

February

March

April

May

League Cup

Football League Trophy

FA Cup

See also
Bristol Rovers F.C.
2010–11 in English football
2010–11 Football League One

References

External links
 Bristol Rovers F.C. Official Website
 Bristol Evening Post
 Soccerbase – Results | Stats | Transfers

Bristol Rovers F.C. seasons
Bristol Rovers